Sher Muhammad Khan, (Punjabi), better known by his pen name Ibn-e-Insha,, (Punjabi) (15 June 1927 –  11 January 1978) was a Pakistani Urdu poet, humorist, travelogue writer and newspaper columnist. Along with his poetry, he was regarded as one of the best humorists of Urdu. His poetry has a distinctive diction laced with language reminiscent of Amir Khusro in its use of words and construction that is usually heard in the more earthy dialects of the Hindi-Urdu complex of languages, and his forms and poetic style is an influence on generations of young poets.

Biography 
Insha was born in Phillaur tehsil of Jalandhar District, Punjab, India. His father hailed from Rajasthan. In 1946, he received his B.A. degree from Punjab University and subsequently, his M.A. from University of Karachi in 1953. He was associated with various governmental services including Radio Pakistan, the Ministry of Culture and the National Book Centre of Pakistan. He also served the UN for some time and this enabled him to visit many places, all of which served to inspire the travelogues he would then pen. Some of the places he visited include Japan, Philippines, China, Hong Kong, Thailand, Indonesia, Malaysia, India, Afghanistan, Iran, Turkey, France, UK and the United States. His teachers included Habibullah Ghazenfar Amrohvi, Dr. Ghulam Mustafa Khan and Dr. Abdul Qayyum. In the late 1940s, in his youth years, Ibn-e-Insha had also lived together with the renowned film poet Sahir Ludhianvi in Lahore for a short period. He was also active in the Progressive Writers Movement. Ibn-e-Insha spent the remainder of his life in Karachi before he died of Hodgkin's Lymphoma on 11 January 1978, while he was in London. He was later buried in Karachi, Pakistan. His son, Roomi Insha was a Pakistani director until his death on 16 October 2017.

Literary career
Insha is considered to be one of the best poets and writers of his generation. His most famous ghazal Insha Ji Utthoo Ab Kooch Karo  (Rise oh Insha Ji, and let us set off ) is an influential classic ghazal. Ibn-e-Insha had written several travelogues, showcasing his sense of humor and his work has been appreciated by both Urdu writers and critics. He also translated a collection of Chinese poems into Urdu in 1960.

Bibliography
Poetry
 Chand Nagar چاند نگر
 Is Basti Key Ik Koochey Mainاِس بستی کے اِک کوچے میں
 Dil-e-Wehshi دلِ وحشی
 Billo Ka Basta بِلو کا بستہ (Rhymes for Children)
 Qissa Aik Kunvaaray ka (A translation of a lengthy humorous poem by a German poet Wilhelm Bosch)
Travelogue
 Awara Gard Ki Diary آوارہ گرد کی ڈائری
 Dunya Gol Hey  دنیا گول ہے
 Ibn Battuta Kay Taqub mein' (1974)
 Chaltay Ho To Cheen Ko Chaliye  چلتے ھو تو چِین کو چلیے
 Nagri Nagri Phira Musafar  نگری نگری پِھرا مسافر

Humor
 Urdu Ki Aakhri Kitaab (1971) اردو کی آخری کتاب Ibn-e-Insha article on Academy of the Punjab in North America (APNA) website Retrieved 14 June 2019
 Khat Insha Jee Kay  خط انشّا جی کے Collection of letters 
 Khumar e Gandum خمارِگندم
 Aap se kya Parda آپ سے کیا پردہ (published in June 2004)
 Batain Insha ji ki (published in June 2005)
 Dakhl Dar Ma'qulaat (published in June 2019)
Translations
 Seher Honay Tak (translation of Cherkhov work)
 Karnamay Nawab Tees Maar Khan Kay (translation of German Short stories), published in June 1971
 Lakhon Ka Shaher (translation of some short stories of O. Henry)
 Andha Kunvaan'' (translation of some short stories of Edgar Allan Poe)

Awards and recognition
 Ibn-e-Insha was awarded the Pride of Performance Award by the President of Pakistan in 1978.

See also
 List of Pakistani poets
 List of Urdu language poets
 List of Pakistani writers
 List of Urdu language writers

References

External links 
 
 http://www.studybee.net/ibn-e-insha-poetry/ Poetry of Ibn-e-Insha

University of the Punjab alumni
1927 births
1978 deaths
People from British India
People from Jalandhar
Muhajir people
Urdu-language poets from Pakistan
Pakistani humorists
University of Karachi alumni
Urdu-language humorists
Pakistani Muslims
Pakistani Sunni Muslims
Pakistani travel writers
Writers from Karachi
Urdu-language children's writers
20th-century Urdu-language writers
Urdu-language travel writers
Urdu-language columnists
20th-century poets
Recipients of the Pride of Performance
Poets from Karachi